Jamil Ali is a Singapore international football player.

Club career
He started his career with Tampines Rovers before moving to Geylang United in 2002.  He later was called to represent the Young Lions in 2004 before returning to  Geylang United in 2006. After his contract with the Eagles end, he joined SAFFC in 2007 and won 2 league titles with them. In 2009, he joined Woodlands Wellington and moved back to Tampines Rovers in 2010 after the Rams decided against extending his contract. He is the brother of Mohd Noor Ali who is currently Assistant Head Coach and Prime League Coach of Geylang International .

After spending 6 seasons with The Stags, Jamil was seriously considering retirement from the sport when Balestier came calling. Attracted by the promise of ample playing time, Jamil put pen to paper and signed for Balestier.

International career
He played for the National Team once in 2004.

References

External links

1984 births
Living people
Singaporean footballers
Singapore international footballers
Balestier Khalsa FC players
Geylang International FC players
Tampines Rovers FC players
Warriors FC players
Woodlands Wellington FC players
Singapore Premier League players
Association football wingers
Young Lions FC players